Terry L. Baker (born November 24, 1955/1956) is an American politician. He is a member of the Maryland House of Delegates for District 1C in Allegany and Washington counties. He was previously the vice president of the Washington County Board of Commissioners from 2006 to 2010 and from 2018 to 2022, and the board's president from 2010 to 2018.

Career
Terry L. Baker was born on November 24, 1955/1956. Baker grew up in Pinesburg, Maryland, and graduated from Williamsport High School. He attended Hagerstown Junior College, where he earned an A.A. degree in 1975, and Auburn University, where he earned a B.S. degree in education in 1978.

After graduating, he worked as a carpentry coordinator at Washington County Technical High School. Baker also coached cross country running and track and field at a local high school until he was elected county commissioner in 2006. He retired from Washington County Public Schools in July 2015. Baker continues to operate his own home improvements contracting business.

Baker entered politics in 2002, when he became a member of the Clear Spring town council. In 2004, he became the town's assistant mayor. Since 2006, he has worked in various county government offices, including in the Board of Health, Economic Development Commission, and Social Services Board.

On December 6, 2010, Baker was sworn in as the vice president of the Washington County Board of Commissioners, later serving as the board's president from 2010 to 2018 and becoming the vice president after the end of his presidency. 

On July 14, 2021, Baker filed to run for the Maryland House of Delegates in District 1C, seeking to succeed Delegate Mike McKay, who had previously announced that he would run for the Maryland Senate in 2022. He won the Republican primary on July 19, 2022, and later defeated Democratic challenger Carrie R. Hinton and Green Party challenger Charlotte McBraerty in the general election on November 8.

2016 House of Representatives campaign 

On July 12, 2015, Baker announced that he would run for the United States House of Representatives in Maryland's 6th congressional district, challenging incumbent John Delaney. Baker finished second to Amie Hoeber, a former United States Secretary of the Army deputy under President Ronald Reagan, in the Republican primary election, receiving 23.1 percent of the vote.

In the legislature 
Baker was sworn into the Maryland House of Delegates on January 11, 2023. He is a member of the House Environment and Transportation Committee.

Personal life 
Baker is married and has two children and three grandchildren. He owns two homes, including one in Clear Spring, Maryland, and another in Frost, West Virginia.

Baker is an accomplished distance runner, placing seventh at the 1982 Boston Marathon.

On July 25, 2018, Baker's wife, Katrina, filed for a temporary protective order against him, accusing him of "slapping, shoving, stalking and verbally abusing her over two separate incidents at the couple's homes" in July. She was granted a temporary protective order, but she withdrew her petition on July 26 after she and her husband negotiated a separation agreement.

Political positions

Education
Baker opposed the Common Core State Standards, saying that they "should be a decision made by parents and teachers, if they want it in their schools or not."

Energy
In March 2018, Baker expressed concerns over a pipeline project proposed by Columbia Gas Transmission that would stretch from southern Pennsylvania through Maryland to another planned pipeline in West Virginia.

Foreign policy
In September 2015, Baker said he opposed the Iran nuclear deal.

Taxes
In June 2019, Baker voted against increasing Washington County's income tax rate from 2.8 percent to 3.2 percent so the county could receive a larger disparity grant, expressing concerns that the grants were not guaranteed in the long run. In April 2021, Baker voted in favor of lowering the tax rate back to 2.8 percent.

Electoral history

References

External links
 

21st-century American politicians
1950s births
Auburn University alumni
Living people
People from Washington County, Maryland
Republican Party members of the Maryland House of Delegates

Year of birth uncertain
County commissioners in Maryland